Branislav Nedimović (born 27 November 1977) is a Serbian politician who served as deputy prime minister of Serbia from 2020 to 2022 and as minister of agriculture, forestry and water economy from 2016 to 2022. A member of the Serbian Progressive Party (SNS), he previously served as mayor of Sremska Mitrovica from 2008 to 2016.

Biography 
Branislav Nedimović was born on 27 November 1977. Nedimović completed elementary school and high school in his hometown of Sremska Mitrovica. He graduated from the University of Novi Sad, Faculty of Law with a bachelor's degree.

He was elected a Member of the National Assembly of the Republic of Serbia in 2003 as a member of the Democratic Party of Serbia. He was re-elected MP in 2008, but resigned due to accepting the position of the mayor of Sremska Mitrovica. He left the Democratic Party of Serbia in the same year, and was active in the "Mitrovica European Region" movement, which has had cooperation with the Democratic Party (not the same as the Democratic Party of Serbia) since 2009 which he joined at the end of 2010. He served as the mayor of Sremska Mitrovica until 2016.

In 2015, he joined the Serbian Progressive Party, and since 2016 he has been a member of the presidency. He is also the Vice President of the board of directors of the National Alliance for Local and Economic Development.

On 11 August 2016, he was appointed as a Minister of Agriculture, Forestry and Water Economy in Vučić's administration.

In February 2017, the Prime Minister of Serbia Aleksandar Vučić declared that he will run for president at the 2017 Serbian presidential elections. He won the elections in the first round beating Saša Janković with 55.06% of the votes and was sworn in as the President of Serbia on 31 May 2017. Weeks later, he gave mandate to Ana Brnabić to form the new cabinet. On 29 June 2017, the cabinet of Ana Brnabić was formed, with Nedimović keeping his office.

In April 2020, he was named as the head of the Serbian Crisis Staff for Nišava and Toplica District to combat the COVID-19 pandemic.

He was selected as a ballot carrier for the Serbian Progressive Party for the 2020 Serbian parliamentary election.

Personal life 
Nedimović has been playing football since elementary school, and currently plays for FK Sloga Zasavica in the Sremska Mitrovica League. Among all registered UEFA players, except for Branislav Nedimović, there is no minister of any government in Europe to officially play football for a team competing in an organized league. Nedimović is married and has two children.

References

External links 

 Званични сајт rs.n1info.com
 Малине у грлу („Политика”, 9. јун 2018)
 Продаја ПКБ-а била је најбоља опција – интервју („Политика”, 22. септембар 2018)
 Ко год буде премијер, мораће много да ради – интервју („Политика”, 18. март 2020)

1977 births
Living people
Serbian Progressive Party politicians
People from Sremska Mitrovica
Mayors of places in Serbia
Members of the National Assembly (Serbia)
Government ministers of Serbia
University of Novi Sad alumni

Democratic Party of Serbia politicians
Democratic Party (Serbia) politicians
Deputy Prime Ministers of Serbia